Philippe Révillon (born 1970 or 1971 in Angers) is a French swimmer.

Representing France at the Paralympic Games, and competing in S2 category for athletes with severe disabilities, he won a bronze medal in the men's 100 metre freestyle in 2000, followed by two bronze (100 m freestyle, 200 m freestyle) and a silver (50 m freestyle) in 2004.

Révillon works as a banker.

References

External links
 

Paralympic swimmers of France
Swimmers at the 2000 Summer Paralympics
Swimmers at the 2004 Summer Paralympics
Paralympic silver medalists for France
Paralympic bronze medalists for France
French male freestyle swimmers
Living people
Year of birth uncertain
Medalists at the 2000 Summer Paralympics
Medalists at the 2004 Summer Paralympics
Paralympic medalists in swimming
1970s births
S2-classified Paralympic swimmers